In architecture, a core is a vertical space used for circulation and services. It may also be referred to as a circulation core or service core. A core may include staircases, elevators, electrical cables, water pipes and risers.

A core allows people to move between the floors of a building, and distributes services efficiently to the floors.

Architectural elements